Antônio Carlos Santos (born 8 June 1964) is a Brazilian former footballer. He played the bulk of his career for Club América in Mexico. 

He was a commentator of Liga MX games for the Mexican television network TV Azteca as well as co-hosted the network's flagship sports program, Los Protagonistas (The Protagonists).

Honours
Club América
Primera División: 1987–88, 1988–89
Campeón de Campeones: 1987–88, 1988–1989
CONCACAF Champions Cup: 1987, 1990, 1992
Copa Interamericana: 1991

Individual 
Mexican Balón de Oro: 1987–88

References

External links 
  on ForaDeJogo

1964 births
Living people
Footballers from Rio de Janeiro (city)
Brazilian footballers
Brazilian expatriate footballers
Fluminense FC players
C.D. Veracruz footballers
Tigres UANL footballers
Club América footballers
Atlético Morelia players
Santos Laguna footballers
Atlante F.C. footballers
Sanfrecce Hiroshima players
FC Porto players
Primeira Liga players
Liga MX players
J1 League players
Expatriate footballers in Japan
Expatriate footballers in Mexico
Expatriate footballers in Portugal

Association football midfielders